Kim Ashfield (born 5 January 1959) is a former model from Wales who was awarded the title of Miss United Kingdom in 1980. As Miss Wales, she competed in Miss Universe 1980. As Miss United Kingdom, she placed as the 4th runner-up in Miss World 1980.

Pageants
Ashfield won the Miss Wales title early in 1980 and went on to represent Wales at Miss Universe 1980 on 8 July in Seoul, where she was unplaced. She then won the Miss United Kingdom title. 1st runner-up was Nicky Poole and 2nd runner-up was that years Miss England, Julie Duckworth. Ashfield was only the fourth Welsh woman to win the Miss UK title, after Rosemarie Frankland in 1961, Helen Morgan in 1974, both of whom went on to win the Miss World title and Elizabeth Jones in 1978 (6th at Miss World). On 13 November at Miss World 1980 in London, Ashfield became the third Welsh woman to reach the top five of the Miss World contest. The following years Miss United Kingdom, Michelle Donnelly, was also Welsh and also placed fifth at Miss World 1981. It would be over thirty years until a Welsh contestant returned to the top five, when Sophie Moulds was 1st runner-up at Miss World 2012.

Filmography
A View to a Kill (1985) - The Girl

References

1959 births
Living people
Miss United Kingdom winners
Miss Universe 1980 contestants
Miss World 1980 delegates
Welsh beauty pageant winners
Welsh female models